Azure Lake is a fjord-like lake located in east-central British Columbia, Canada. It is an expansion of the Azure River which rises from an unnamed glacier in the Cariboo Mountains. Azure Lake is one of the six major lakes in Wells Gray Provincial Park.

Geography
North of the lake are Mount Huntley, Batoche Peak, Tryfan Mountain, and Buchanan Peak. Garn

';et Peak, Wells Gray Park's third highest mountain, rises north of Tryfan, but is not visible from anywhere on the lake. South of the lake are Zodiac Mountain and Azure Mountain. East of the lake's upper end is Mount Hogue. The deeply incised valley of Azure Lake was carved by glaciers during past Ice Ages resulting in rugged and steep shorelines. Hanging valleys are seen along both sides of the lake and there are waterfalls on nearly every tributary stream; Garnet Falls, Crystal Falls, Roostertail Falls, and Rainbow Falls are the most notable.

Origin of names
Azure Lake refers to its colour. The name appeared on a map in 1914 and in the BC Gazetteer in 1930. It was sometimes also called Blue Lake. Angus Horne may have named the lake. He settled at Blue River in the North Thompson Valley in 1912 and prospected, trapped and explored in these mountains. 
Angus Horne Lake and Angus Horne Creek which flows into Azure Lake are named for him (see above).
Mount Huntley was named by Chess Lyons in 1940. He was dispatched by Arthur Wellesley Gray, British Columbia's Minister of Lands, six months after Wells Gray Park was created, to explore the park and report on its significant features. Huntley Campbell was his assistant. 
Buchanan Peak was also named by Chess Lyons. Robert "Buck" and Sarah Buchanan were from Texas and lived at Deception Point on Mahood Lake from 1933 to 1941. His two boats, Albedrio and Manana, transported the Lyons expedition along Mahood and Canim Lakes.
Garnet Peak was named by Hugh Neave after leading the first ascent in 1974. He found garnets in several places on the peak.   
Tryfan Mountain was named by Hugh Neave after the Welsh peak where he learned rock climbing as a boy. 
Mount Hogue was named by Chess Lyons for trappers Henry and John Hogue who built Helmcken Falls Lodge, Wells Gray Park's first lodging, in 1948.

Access and trails
There are no roads to Azure Lake. The only access is by boat from the end of the Clearwater Valley Road at the south end of Clearwater Lake. Canoeists and kayakers can paddle up Clearwater Lake, then take the portage trail over to Azure Lake. Azure Lake can also be reached by a water taxi operated by Clearwater Lake Tours. A popular multi-day trip is to take the water taxi, loaded with canoes or kayaks, to Rainbow Falls then paddle back to the south end of Clearwater Lake. Access by air is restricted and a special permit from B.C. Parks is required to land a float plane or helicopter at Azure Lake. 

There are four campsites along Azure Lake: Osprey and Rainbow Falls on the south shore and Indian Point and Four and a Half Mile on the north shore. Fees are paid at the boat launching ramp on Clearwater Lake. Sites cannot be reserved in advance.

There is only one hiking trail from the shore of Azure Lake and it leads to Huntley Col. It was first blazed by mountain climber and explorer, Hugh Neave, in 1966 and improved by other hikers. From the Col, the peaks along the Huntley-Buchanan Ridge can be climbed on a multi-day expedition with a base camp at Huntley Col where water is available. Garnet Peak is usually a four-day climb via the Huntley Col trail and requires technical rock climbing experience. Other than this trail, hiking from Azure Lake is difficult due to extremely dense undergrowth.

References

External links
  
Wells Gray Provincial Park official government website
Clearwater Lake Tours and water taxi

Lakes of British Columbia
Wells Gray-Clearwater
Kamloops Division Yale Land District